Dunmanway is a market town in County Cork, in the southwest of Ireland. It is the geographical centre of the region known as West Cork. It is the birthplace of Sam Maguire, an Irish Protestant republican, for whom the trophy of the All-Ireland Senior Football Championship is named.

There is disagreement over the meaning and origin of the town's name.  Various sources list its meaning when translated from Irish as "the castle of the yellow river," "the castle on the little plain," "the fort of the gables (or pinnacles)," and "the fort of the yellow women." The town centre is built on and around two rivers, which are tributaries of the larger River Bandon, which passes by at the east end of the town.

The town is twinned with Quéven, France. Dunmanway won the Irish Tidy Towns Competition in 1982. More recently, the town came to national and international attention thanks to a visit by Liverpool Football Club for a pre-season soccer friendly.

The population of Dunmanway at the 2011 census was 1,585, rising to 1,655 by the 2016 census.

History

Dunmanway has been inhabited since prehistoric times, as testified by a Bronze Age trumpet in the British Museum. From the mid-13th to the late 17th century the surrounding districts of the town of Dunmanway were included in the territory of the MacCarthy Clan.

Dunmanway Castle once stood on a bank of the Sally River on the left-hand side of present-day Castle Street. It was one of the chief residences of the MacCarthy Lords of Gleannacroim, cousins of the MacCarthy Reagh sept. Dating from the late 15th century, the tower house is recorded to have been built by Catherine Fitzgerald. There was likely a small settlement in the environs of the castle. 

19th-century references date the founding of Dunmanway to the late 17th century, when the English crown settled a colony there to provide a resting place for troops marching between Bandon and Bantry. By 1700, about thirty families lived in the town.

Sir Richard Cox, Lord Chancellor of Ireland from 1703 to 1707, was the town's most important early patron. In 1693, Cox obtained a grant from King William III to hold market days and fairs in the town and strongly encouraged the development of the local flax industry. To that end, Cox imported artisans from Ulster to teach the required skills. He sponsored numerous incentives for local residents involved in making linen, including rent-free housing for top producers, bonuses for efficient labourers, rewards for schoolgirls who showed strong loom skills, and production contests with generous prizes. In 1735, the town consisted of forty houses and two to three hundred people. By 1747, the linen industry was well established, and Cox's personal census recorded 557 people. Two years later, it rose to 807.

Free market economic policies in England led to the removal of protective duties on linen in 1827. In 1837, Samuel Lewis's Topographical Dictionary of Ireland recorded a population of 2,738. It also recorded the town's changing economic fortunes:

"The manufacture of linen continued to flourish for some years, but at present there are very few looms at work. A porter and ale brewery, established in 1831, produces 2,600 barrels annually; there are also two tanyards and two boulting-mills, the latter capable of grinding annually 15,000 bags of flour, and there are two or three smaller mills in the vicinity. Since 1810 a considerable trade in corn has been carried on."

West Cork was hit hard by the 1840s Great Famine. On 9 February 1847, U.S. Vice President George M. Dallas chaired a famine relief meeting in Washington, D.C. where participants heard a letter addressed to the "Ladies of America" from the women of The Dunmanway Indian Meal Ladies' Committee:

"Oh! that our American sisters could see the labourers on our roads, able-bodied men, scarcely clad, famishing with hunger, with despair in their once cheerful faces, staggering at their work ... oh! that they could see the dead father, mother or child, lying coffinless and hear the screams of the survivors around them, caused not by sorrow, but by the agony of hunger."

In the early 1850s, following the migrations and evictions which characterized the famine's upheavals, more than seventy percent of Dunmanway residents did not own any land.

On 28 November 1920, during the Irish War of Independence (1919–1921), seventeen British Auxiliary Division troops were killed by the Irish Republican Army at the Kilmichael Ambush (near Dunmanway). The subsequent sacking and burning of the city of Cork by the British forces is thought to be linked to the Kilmichael Ambush. On 15 December 1920, an Auxiliary shot dead the local priest, Canon Magner, for refusing to toll his church's bells on Armistice Day; a local boy, Tadhg Crowley, was also killed in an apparently random incident. There were numerous other actions in and around Dunmanway during the war (see Chronology of the Irish War of Independence). In addition, after a truce was declared in July 1921, the local IRA killed a number of alleged informers. Controversy continues in particular over the killing of ten men (including three residents of Dunmanway) in the spring of 1922, all of whom were Protestants (see Dunmanway killings).

Demographics

The demonym for a person living in Dunmanway is Doheny. This is as the local Gaelic Athletic Association club is known as "The Dohenys" in honour of Michael Doheny, a member of the Young Ireland nationalist movement who lived in the area for a short period.

Immigration to the town and surrounding areas began in the 1970s. The 2016 census indicates a small number of people from the United Kingdom, Poland, Lithuania and elsewhere within the European Union.

In terms of religion, census returns indicate that people in Dunmanway are predominantly Roman Catholic. There are also two Protestant denominations in the town, namely the Church of Ireland and Methodism. While still majority Catholic, the rural area around Dunmanway has one of the highest percentage of non-Catholics in the Republic of Ireland.

Culture 
The Ballabuidhe Festival is held annually over the August Bank Holiday weekend and centres around both the Ballabuidhe Horse Fair and Ballabuidhe Races. The Ballabuidhe Horse Fair dates back to 1615, when King James I granted Randal Óg Hurley a charter to hold a fair at Béal Átha Buidhe on the River Bandon.

The Dunmanway Agricultural Show, first held in 1946, takes place on the first Sunday in July each year, and with contested classes including horses, cattle and horticulture.

The Sam Maguire Festival runs in September, and focuses on the life and ethos of Sam Maguire.

Sport

Gaelic games
Dohenys is the local Gaelic Athletic Association club and the club play their home matches at Sam Maguire Park. Dohenys' under-age teams play under the name "Sam Maguires".

Dohenys currently compete at the senior grade of the Cork county football championship, and reached the county final in 2006, losing to Nemo Rangers. The club's most famous player is probably Éamonn Young, who captained Cork to victory in the National Football League and the Munster Football Championship in 1952, having also been a part of Cork's All-Ireland-winning team of 1945.

Although the club has historically enjoyed more success in football, Dohenys became Munster Junior B Hurling champions in 2007.

Soccer
The local soccer club is Dunmanway Town, which plays in the Premier Division of the West Cork League. In June 2009, it was sensationally announced that the world-famous Liverpool F.C. had agreed to visit Dunmanway to play Town in a pre-season friendly on 6 August 2009. Liverpool, fielding players from their reserve and youth teams (the home side supplemented their line-up with a number of players from prominent Cork-based clubs like Avondale United  and Cobh Ramblers F.C.) won the game by one goal to nil in front of 6,800 fans, and Gardaí estimated that more than 15,000 people visited Dunmanway on the day to catch a glimpse of the Liverpool stars of the future.

Angling 
The stretch of the River Bandon which flows east through Dunmanway holds brown trout, sea trout and salmon.

Other sports

Other sports clubs in the town include rugby, athletics, pitch and putt and badminton. Dunmanway has also been home to an indoor heated swimming pool for many years, with the 25-metre pool being the only public swimming pool in the West Cork area.

August 2010 saw the revived "Munster 100" motorcycle road race take place in Dunmanway. This was followed 24 months later by the first Dunmanway 'Lightning Sprint' Grand Prix motorcycle meet.

Like other parts of County Cork, road bowling is a popular sport in the surrounding area, and the All-Ireland road bowling championships took place in Dunmanway in July 2011. Dunmanway is fondly known as 'The Volleyball Capital of Ireland.'

Employment

Today, the construction industry and agriculture play a large part in the economic environment of the town.

Between 1975 and 1999, Swedish multinational firm Mölnlycke Health Care operated a manufacturing facility in Dunmanway. The plant employed over 250 people at its peak.

Transport
Dunmanway is approximately 60km southwest from Cork City, on the N71 national secondary road, and the R586 regional road. The town is served by Bus Éireann bus service from Cork City. The nearest airport is Cork Airport.

Dunmanway railway station opened on 12 June 1866 and closed entirely on 1 April 1961.

Local lore

A later scion of the Cox family, Richard, heard that a preacher allied to John Wesley was due to visit the town and decided to give him a ducking in the local lake. To practice he went out in a boat but fell into the water and was drowned. The event was commemorated by the following verse:

"'Tis there the lake is,
Where the duck and the drake is,
And 'tis there the crane can have his fine feed of frogs.
When night come's round it,
The spirits surround it,
For in it was drownded Sir Richard Cox."

People
George Beamish, rugby player for Ireland and the British and Irish Lions in the 1920s and 1930s
Victor Beamish, RAF ace fighter pilot in WWII
Lee Carsley, qualified to play for the Republic of Ireland by virtue of his grandmother being from Dunmanway, and was a visitor to the town as a youth.
Richard B. Connolly, American politician
Thomas Hovenden, artist and teacher
Con O'Kelly, wrestler, gold medalist at 1908 Olympics
James MacCarthy, sculptor
Sam Maguire, Gaelic football player/ Irish republican
John McCarthy, athlete, silver medalist in discus at 2004 Paralympic Games
Michael McCarthy, Labour Party politician and former member of Dáil Éireann
Timothy J. Murphy, Labour Party politician and Minister for Local Government in the First Inter-Party Government
Darren Sweetnam, former Cork Hurler and current Munster Rugby player
Éamonn Young (gaelic football), Jim Young and Kevin Murray (hurling), Aoife Murray (camogie) are All-Ireland winners within various GAA codes

See also
List of towns and villages in Ireland

References

External links

Dunmanway Town
Travel Dunmanway
Doheny GAA Club
The Tidy Towns of Ireland "Celebrating 50 years"

Towns and villages in County Cork